Pearl City is a census-designated place of O'ahu island, Hawaii,

Pearl City may also refers to:
 Thoothukudi, also known as Tuticorin, a pearl city of Tamil Nadu, India
 Herat, today in Afghanistan, was known as the Pearl of Khorasan in the 13th century
 Pearl City, Illinois, a village in Stephenson County, Illinois
 Pearll City, Michigan, an unincorporated community
 Pearl City, Florida, a neighborhood in Boca Raton, Florida
 Pearl City, Texas, a small unincorporated community in DeWitt County, Texas

See also
 Pearl City High School (disambiguation)
 City of Pearl, a 2004 science fiction novel by English author Karen Traviss
 Pearl, Mississippi, a city in Rankin County, Mississippi
 Pearl (disambiguation)